Lebbeus Edward A Hordern, known as Edward Hordern, (21 March 1941  - 2 May 2000 ) was the world's leading authority on sliding block puzzles, and was renowned for his puzzle solving abilities.

Hordern had an extensive mechanical puzzle collection and was an author on the topic of mechanical puzzles. His best known book is "Sliding Piece Puzzles", originally published in 1986 by Oxford University Press.

In 1993, Hordern edited, corrected and privately published a Centenary Edition of the famous "Puzzles Old & New" by Professor Hoffmann, including photographs of many original puzzles of the 1890s, mostly from his own collection.

Hordern's family gave the puzzle collection, including the famed Hoffmann puzzles, to collector James Dalgety, founder of Pentangle Puzzles and curator of the Puzzle Museum.

References

External links 
Hoffman's Puzzles Old & New - Centenary Edition - published by Edward Hordern
James Dalgety's Puzzle Museum, home to many of Hordern's puzzles
A sliding link puzzle dedicated to Edward Hordern by Minoru Abe

1941 births
2000 deaths
Puzzle designers